Elk Neck State Park is a public recreation area located between Chesapeake Bay and the Elk River near the southern tip of the Elk Neck Peninsula in Cecil County, Maryland. The state park is home to the historic Turkey Point Light and offers land-based and water-based recreation. It is operated by the Maryland Department of Natural Resources.

History
The park had its genesis when, in 1936, naturalist Dr. William Abbott bequeathed his holdings along the Elk River to the state for use as a state park. Although he originally intended the land to be a gift to the Boy Scouts, a meeting with State Forester Fred W. Besley in 1935 persuaded Abbott to change the terms of his will. Following the state's purchase of additional acreage, the Civilian Conservation Corps created park improvements from 1937 to 1941.

Activities and amenities
Turkey Point Lighthouse
Dating from 1833, the Turkey Point Lighthouse sits on a  bluff overlooking the Upper Chesapeake Bay. The  tower is a "private aid to navigation" maintained by a non-profit organization, Turkey Point Light Station, Inc., which offers weekend tours seasonally.
Campgrounds
The park offers more than 250 campsites, rustic cabins, camper cabins, and youth group sites.
Trails
The park has  of trails for hiking and biking. 

Water recreation
The park offers a swimming beach, fishing, and crabbing, plus a boat launch and launch area for canoeing and kayaking.

Ecology
The park is part of the Northeastern coastal forests ecoregion, with a landscape characterized by deep forests, bluffs, beaches, and marshlands.

In popular culture
The park was used as a filming location for the 1997 Clint Eastwood movie Absolute Power, The Curve (1998 film) and as the setting of an episode of the television series Hannibal.

References

External links

Elk Neck State Park Maryland Department of Natural Resources
Elk Neck State Park Map Maryland Department of Natural Resources
Turkey Point Light Station Turkey Point Light Station, Inc.

State parks of Maryland
Parks in Cecil County, Maryland
Protected areas established in 1936
1936 establishments in Maryland
Civilian Conservation Corps in Maryland
IUCN Category III